KIIS-FM (102.7 MHz) is a commercial radio station licensed to Los Angeles, California, United States, and broadcasts to the Greater Los Angeles area. The station airs a Top 40 (CHR) format. Owned by iHeartMedia, KIIS-FM is the origin of the conglomerate's KISS-FM brand (with the call sign pronounced as "kiss"), and serves as the flagship station for the radio program On Air with Ryan Seacrest. KIIS-FM's studios are located in Burbank, while the station transmitter resides on Mount Wilson, north of Los Angeles.

In addition to a standard analog transmission, KIIS-FM broadcasts over two HD Radio channels including "Evolution" on its HD2 subchannel, featuring an all-dance music format; streaming online via iHeartRadio; and extends its on-air signal by using a single full-power repeater, KVVS (105.5 FM) in Rosamond, California. The station also simulcasted over channel 11, and later channel 14 on Sirius XM satellite radio until June 2022. KIIS-FM has consistently been rated the number-one radio station in the Los Angeles/Orange County and Ventura County markets, averaging nearly one million listeners. Currently its secondary HD Radio subchannel merely serves to delay KIIS-FM's primary audio by ten seconds.

As of December 2021, KIIS-FM is the only Top 40 station in the Los Angeles area, after Audacy's KNOU flipped to a simulcast of KNX and changed its callsign to KNX-FM.

History

KLAC/KRHM
The station at the 102.7 FM frequency first signed on in 1961 as KLAC-FM, a sister station to KLAC (570 AM). It swapped frequencies with KRHM (which had gone on the air at 94.7 FM in 1948 as KFMV) in 1965.

KKDJ/K-Double-I-S
KRHM changed its call sign to KKDJ and flipped to contemporary hit radio (CHR, also known as Top 40) on April 15, 1971. The format lasted until 1975, when Combined Communications purchased KKDJ. The station's format was changed to adult contemporary on October 22, 1975 at 6:00 a.m., during Charlie Tuna's morning show when KKDJ began simulcasting with KIIS (1150 AM) with an on-air mock wedding, with KKDJ "marrying" KIIS. Meanwhile, KKDJ's call letters were changed to KIIS-FM. The spelling of "K-I-I-S" instead of KISS was because it resembled the AM frequency: "1150" = "IIS". The new merged station was referred to as, "AM and FM, K-double-I-S."

Making the transition from KKDJ to KIIS-FM were popular disc jockeys including Humble Harve, Jay Stevens, John Peters, Danny Martinez, and Charlie Tuna. Tuna, an iconic voice of Los Angeles radio, served as both program director and morning show host for KKDJ and KIIS-FM at the transition; he died in February 2016. In 1977, KIIS-FM hired Gary McKenzie as its news director; later, he went on to anchor at RKO Radio Networks and CBS. The AM and FM stations did simulcasts during the day while returning to two separate stations in the evening hours.

102.7 KIIS-FM
Unable to draw high ratings with adult contemporary, KIIS-FM began to evolve, first to Top 40 in 1976, then dance and disco music in 1978, and back to Top 40 in 1980. KIIS (AM) would keep its soft rock/AC format until late 1979. Just prior to this, Gannett Company purchased both the KIIS-AM-FM station pair and Combined Communications. In 1981, the format of KIIS (AM) was changed to religious talk and new call letters KPRZ were adopted.

Rick Dees joined the station for mornings in July 1981 after KHJ switched formats to country music. Fill-in personality Dave Sebastian (Williams), working both the AM and FM stations at the time, hosted the vacated FM morning show until the arrival of Dees due to a non-compete clause in his contract. With Dees in mornings, KIIS became a CHR powerhouse in Los Angeles.

In 1985, KIIS (AM) returned to a Top 40 format and simulcast KIIS-FM's morning and afternoon shows, while all other dayparts had different disc jockeys. This would last until around 1988, when it transitioned to a full-time simulcast when the Federal Communications Commission (FCC) relaxed the rules on major-market stations simulcasting each other. The simulcast continued until 1997, when the AM station flipped to sports talk as KXTA, simulcasting with XETRA-AM in Tijuana/San Diego until 2005.

In a 1996 deal in which Gannett acquired WTSP television in the Tampa, Florida market from Jacor/Citicasters, KIIS-AM-FM were acquired by Jacor/Citicasters, which in 1998, merged into Clear Channel Communications (now iHeartMedia). After Clear Channel's acquisition of KAVS and KYHT, the two High Desert stations abandoned their previous modern rock format and together began serving as repeaters for KIIS-FM. Another simulcast, KIIS (1220 AM) in Santa Clarita, was added in 1999, as well as KFMS (101.9 FM) in Las Vegas.

The grouping of KIIS-FM in Los Angeles, KIIS in Santa Clarita, KAVS (97.7 FM) in the Antelope Valley, KYHT (105.3 FM) in Barstow—Victor Valley, and KFMS in Las Vegas created nearly continuous coverage of KIIS-FM between Los Angeles and Las Vegas. (KFMS was branded as "KISS" instead of "KIIS".) However, this regional network was short-lived as KYHT broke its simulcast off in 2001 to become a repeater for KZXY-FM. Resulting from KYHT's flip from the KIIS-FM moniker, KFMS switched to all-local programming. KAVS was relocated from 97.7 to 105.5 FM in December 2007 and adopted the call sign KVVS. KIIS (AM) became KHTS in 2003. KIIS-FM was also simulcast on 850 AM in Thousand Oaks, California in the last year before that station's towers were demolished.

In February 2004, the decade-long general manager of KIIS-FM, Roy Laughlin, elected not to renew Rick Dees' contract, replacing him with Ryan Seacrest from sister station KYSR and retaining co-host Ellen K to team with Seacrest. Together, they created the nationally syndicated On-Air With Ryan Seacrest, which airs on many of iHeartMedia's Top 40/CHR stations.
 
Trade publication Radio & Records named KIIS-FM its 2007 "Station of the Year" in the Contemporary Hit Radio/Top 40 category for market size 1–25 at its national convention.

In December 2007, KIIS-FM's Antelope Valley simulcast on KOSS (97.7 FM) was moved to 105.5 FM, replacing the previous format as "105.5 The Oasis". The country music format at 103.1 FM in Tehachapi, California was moved to 97.7 FM (now operating under 103.1's former call letters KTPI-FM) and is now branded as 97.7 KTPI. KSRY (103.1 FM) in Tehachapi became a simulcast of KYSR (98.7 FM, "Alt 98-7").

The station was, according to Radio & Records in 2008, the second-highest revenue billing radio station in the United States (behind WTOP-FM in Washington, D.C.), with $66.3 million. In 2010, the station was honored by the National Association of Broadcasters with the Marconi Award for CHR Station of the Year.

On June 8, 2011, KIIS-FM began rebroadcasting on Sirius XM channel 11. At the end of 2003, Clear Channel replaced the KIIS simulcast with an exclusive KISS XM channel. In 2004, all XM music channels went commercial-free, and KIIS-FM was replaced with a unique-to-XM "KISS-XM" channel, retaining the same format. Since then, Clear Channel/iHeartMedia has regained the right to air commercials on their XM music channels. On June 1, 2022, the KIIS-FM simulcast left SiriusXM, with the launch and establishment of the iHeartRadio platform making the arrangement less important.

In May 2017, Seacrest became co-host of the New York City-based syndicated talk show Live with Kelly. To accommodate the new role, it was announced that Seacrest would begin to host On Air from a studio constructed at the facilities of WABC-TV (where the TV show is produced). The show continues to air live, although the first hour will either be pre-recorded or handled mostly by co-host Sisanie.

On January 3, 2020, it was announced that midday host Alex Gervasi had exited the station after 6 years. Her successor was not formally nominated. This was later followed by DJ Drew on January 16, 2020, as a result of a series of nationwide layoffs by iHeartMedia.

References

External links

SiriusXM.com: KIIS
List of "grandfathered" FM radio stations in the U.S.

1948 establishments in California
Contemporary hit radio stations in the United States
Radio stations established in 1948
IIS-FM
Sirius Satellite Radio channels
XM Satellite Radio channels
IHeartMedia radio stations
Sirius XM Radio channels